The Placentia-Yorba Linda Unified School District (PYLUSD) is a public  school district that serves Placentia, Yorba Linda, and parts of Anaheim, Brea, and Fullerton located in northeast Orange County, California and is rapidly developing county territory that reaches the Riverside County line. Its student enrollment is approximately 24,000, and the District's 34 school sites include 20 elementary schools, 5 middle schools, 1 K-8 school, 4 comprehensive high schools, 1 special education school, 1 continuation high school, 1 TK-12 home school, and 1 K-12 online school, alongside 5 state preschools. The Superintendent is Dr. James Elsasser, Ed.D., and the Board of Education includes Carrie Buck, Marilyn Anderson, Leandra Blades, Shawn Youngblood, and Karin Freeman. Twenty-five schools have been designated California Distinguished Schools, eight have been named National Blue Ribbon Schools, seventeen have been honored as California Gold Ribbon Schools, one has earned the title of California Model Continuation High School, and another has received California's Exemplary Independent Study recognition. The District has also been placed on the College Board’s AP District Honor Roll three times since the program's inception in 2011. The high schools featured are consistently named to "America's Best High Schools" rankings issued by Newsweek, U.S. News & World Report, and other news organizations.

Academics 
Academically, the District's students excel on standardized tests, outpacing both state and county averages. Students have won high honors in the county, state, and national competitions, including Academic Decathlon and Science Olympiad tournaments, Mock Trial, and both visual and performing arts competitions. The District averages 30 National Merit and Commended Scholars each year. Graduating classes traditionally earn millions of dollars in academic and athletic scholarships. Graduates attend the most prestigious colleges and universities and often receive appointments to the Air Force Academy, Annapolis and West Point. Notably, Olympic gold medal winners Janet Evans and Michele Granger are among these graduates, as are former State Senator John Lewis, world-renowned opera soprano Deborah Voigt, nationally recognized physician Dr. William Schoolcraft, baseball stars Dan Petry, Phil Nevin, and Brett Boone, and NASA astronaut Joe Acaba.

History 
The school district dates back to 1874 and has always maintained a rich, historical tradition. A portion of the 1912 Bradford schoolhouse still stands at one of our current high school sites, which opened in 1933. The remainder of the District's existing schools were built primarily in the 1960s and 1970s. Thanks to two community bond measures, four new schools opened between 2004 and 2009. The bonds also provided for the renovation of every school in the District and resulted in modernized classrooms equipped with the latest teaching technology tools, new libraries, new school offices, new science labs, computer pods between classrooms, expanded parking lots, new gyms, new playgrounds, new gyms, new training, and locker rooms, and much more.

The Placentia-Yorba Linda Unified School District obtained its name after the 1989 merger between the school districts serving the established community of Placentia and the growing area of Yorba Linda.  In 2002 and 2008, the community expressed their support of schools by approving school bond measures to renovate existing schools and build new ones.

Schools and principals

Elementary schools 

Brookhaven: Julie Lucas
Bryant Ranch: Christopher Chiu
Fairmont: Cindy Rex
George Key: Kim Smith
Glenknoll: David Cammarato
Glenview: Alondra Ramos
Golden: Allison DeMark
Lakeview: Stephanie Given
Linda Vista: Kristen Petrovacki
Mabel Paine: Geoffrey Smith
Melrose: Cynthia Alvarez

Morse: Tonya Gordillo
Rio Vista: Jose Cabrera
Rose Drive: Kathleen Escaleras-Nappi
Ruby Drive: Diana McKibben
Sierra Vista: Jacque Bluemel
Topaz: Christa Borgese
Travis Ranch: Taylor Holloway
Tynes: Debra Silverman
Van Buren: David Cammarato
Wagner: Janice Weber
Woodsboro: George Lopez

Middle schools 

Bernardo Yorba: Ken Valburg
Kraemer: Keith Carmona
Travis Ranch: Taylor Holloway
Tuffree: Cindy Freeman
Valadez: Cuco Gracian
Yorba Linda: Greg Kemp

High schools 
El Dorado: Joey Davis
Esperanza: Jeff Giles
Valencia: Chris Herzfeld
Yorba Linda: Dave Flynn

Alternative education schools 
El Camino Real (9–12 continuation): Carey Cecil
La Entrada (9–12 independent study) – Director of Alternative Education: Carrie Bisgard
Parkview (K–12 home school/independent study): James Hardin

References

External links 

School districts in Orange County, California
Placentia, California
Yorba Linda, California
Education in Anaheim, California
Fullerton, California